Mario Pineida (born 6 July 1992) is an Ecuadorian footballer who plays as a full-back for Barcelona SC and the Ecuador national team.

Pineida was called up for the 2015 Copa América making the cut for the final 23 this time around.

Honors

Barcelona SC
Serie A (2): 2016, 2020

References

External links
 ecuafutbol.org
 

1992 births
Living people
Ecuadorian footballers
Ecuadorian Serie A players
C.S.D. Independiente del Valle footballers
Barcelona S.C. footballers
Ecuador international footballers
2015 Copa América players
2021 Copa América players
People from Santo Domingo de Los Tsáchilas Province
Association football fullbacks